The 1948–49 French Rugby Union Championship was won by Castres that beat Mont-de-Marsan in the final.

Formulas
The tournament was played by 48 teams divided into 8 pools.

Twenty-four teams were qualified to play in the second phase with eight pools of three teams. 
Sixteen teams were qualified to play the "Last 16" phase.

Context 

The 1949 Five Nations Championship was won by Ireland, France ended second.

The "Coupe de France" was won by Bègles that beat Toulose in the final.

Second  round 

In bold the qualified for "last 16" phase.

Last 16 

In bold the clubs qualified for the quarter of finals.

Quarter of finals 

In bold the clubs qualified for The semifinals.

Semifinals

Final 

The first match ended 3–3 after over time. A second match was necessary.

External links
 Compte rendu de la finale de 1949 lnr.fr

1949
France 1949
Championship